Balma is a commune in the Haute-Garonne department in southwestern France. It is east of Toulouse.

The name of the town comes from the old Provençal word meaning "cave" or "grotto".

History
Balma was established in 1279 as a fief of the bishopric of Toulouse.

Population

The inhabitants of the commune are known as Balmanais.

Sport
Balma is the home of Championnat de France Amateurs club, Balma SC.

Monument

See also
 Toulouse - Lasbordes Airport
 Stade Municipal de Balma
 11th Parachute Brigade
Communes of the Haute-Garonne department

References

External links

 Official site

Communes of Haute-Garonne